was a town located in Hamana District, Shizuoka Prefecture, Japan.

As of March 31, 2010, the town had an estimated population of 16,975  and a population density of 910 persons per km2. The total area was 18.65 km2.

On March 23, 2010, Arai was merged into the expanded city of Kosai and thus no longer exists as an independent municipality. Hamana District was dissolved as a result of this merger.

Geography
Arai was located at the southwest end of Shizuoka Prefecture, with part of Lake Hamana located within the town boundaries. The town was on the Enshu Sea of the Pacific Ocean, with  a temperate maritime climate with hot, humid summers and mild, cool winters.

History
Arai was located in former Tōtōmi Province, and was largely tenryō territory under direct control of the Tokugawa shogunate in the Edo period, when it was called Arai-juku, and prospered as a post town on the Tōkaidō highway connecting Edo with Kyoto. During the cadastral reform of the early Meiji period in 1889, the area was reorganized into Arai Town within Fuchi District, Shizuoka Prefecture. Fuchi District was merged into Hamana District in 1896.

Economy
The economy of Arai was largely based on commercial fishing, seaweed, and fireworks production.

Transportation

Highway
Japan National Route 1
Japan National Route 42
Route 301 (Japan)

Rail
JR Central – Tōkaidō Main Line

References

External links

Populated places disestablished in 2010
Dissolved municipalities of Shizuoka Prefecture
Cities in Shizuoka Prefecture
Kosai, Shizuoka